Maria Semyonovna Zhukova (1805 – April 26, 1855) was a Russian writer. After divorcing from her husband, she used writing to earn money. She wrote short stories, accounts of her travels, and even a novella.

Biography
Maria was born in 1805 in Arzamas, where her father was a lawyer. They later moved to Saratov. Maria spent her early years in the provinces, where she gained a critical but affectionate appreciation of provincial ways. Her early education in languages and literature was most likely acquired while she was a companion to a daughter of the local nobility.

Maria was married at the age of 17 or 18 to a local landowner who served as a district judge. The marriage was unhappy. Maria's husband was originally wealthy, but lost his money gambling and going on sprees. They eventually separated, but only after Maria had given birth to her only son.

She moved to Saint Petersburg around 1830. Several years later she began writing to support herself and her child, and to pay off some of her husband's debts. Her first story appeared in 1837, and she published works regularly until her death. Her first success came with the two-volume 
story collection Evenings on the Karpovka (1838-1839). Her two-volume collection Tales (1840) was well-received, as was her Sketches of Southern France and Nice (1844). Some of Zhukova's stories are historical, and some are set abroad with non-Russian characters, a common feature of Russian fiction in the Romantic period.

Works
Evenings on the Karpovka (1838–1839). Short stories.
Sketches of Southern France and Nice (1844). Travel accounts.
A Summer Place on the Peterhof Road (1845). Novella.

References

Further reading
Bloomsbury Guide to Women's Literature 

1805 births
1855 deaths
Russian travel writers
Russian women short story writers
People from Arzamas
Women travel writers
19th-century women writers from the Russian Empire
19th-century writers from the Russian Empire
19th-century short story writers from the Russian Empire